Steven Rinella (born February 13, 1974) is an American outdoorsman, conservationist, writer, and television personality known for translating the hunting and fishing lifestyle to a wide variety of audiences.

Early life 
Steven Rinella was born in Twin Lake, Michigan on February 13, 1974. He grew up in Twin Lake along with his two older brothers, who were taught to hunt and fish at an early age by their father.

Career

Television

The Wild Within
Prior to MeatEater, Rinella hosted The Wild Within, an 8-episode series on the Travel Channel.

MeatEater
Rinella is the host of MeatEater, a weekly half-hour hunting show. The show ran for six seasons on Sportsman Channel before moving to Netflix in 2018. The show is based on Rinella's hunting and fishing adventures in such locations as Montana (deer, elk); Alaska (waterfowl, mountain goat, Dall sheep, caribou, black bear, moose); Mexico (wild turkey, buffalo); New Zealand (tahr, chamois, red stag); Arizona (mountain lion, Coues deer); Wisconsin (white-tailed deer, rabbit, beaver, muskrat); and California (wild pigs, quail, and turkey.)

The show offers a defense of hunting and makes the case that hunters are obligated to be stewards of the land and protectors of their chosen prey species. The episodes include interesting and sometimes artful food preparations after the hunt. Examples include a deer's heart wrapped in caul fat and roasted over a fire, javelina meat boiled inside the animal's own stomach, and more common preparations. The series premiered on January 1, 2012, and has completed its eleventh season.

Stars In The Sky: A Hunting Story

A 2018 documentary that follows a group of hunters as they grapple with complexities in the wild. Steven directed and starred in this.

Books 
 The Scavenger's Guide to Haute Cuisine (2006)
 American Buffalo: In Search of a Lost Icon (2009)
 Meat Eater: Adventures from the Life of an American Hunter (2013)
 The Complete Guide to Hunting, Butchering, and Cooking Wild Game (2015)
 The MeatEater Fish and Game Cookbook (2018)
 The Meateater Guide To Wilderness Skills and Survival (2020)
 Outdoor Kids in an Inside World: Getting Your Family Out of the House and Radically Engaged with Nature (2022)

Podcasts
Rinella hosts a podcast called The MeatEater Podcast that ranks among the top ten sports podcasts. In addition to hosting his own podcast, Rinella is also a frequent guest on The Joe Rogan Experience podcast hosted by Joe Rogan.

Awards and nominations
In 2012, MeatEater was nominated for Sportsman Channel's Sportsman Choice Awards for Best New Series, Best Host, Best Hunting Show and Best Educational Show 

A year earlier, The Wild Within was a James Beard Awards finalist for best Television Program, On Location.

American Buffalo won a number of awards, including the Sigurd F. Olson Nature Writing Award and the Pacific Northwest Booksellers Association Award. It was also an Amazon Book of the Month and one of The San Francisco Chronicleʼs best fifty non-fiction books of 2008.

References

External links 
Steven Rinelle MeatEater Profile
http://www.stevenrinella.com/
Steven Rinella articles for Outside Magazine

IMDB - The Wild Within
IMDB - Steven Rinella: Meat Eater

1974 births
Living people
American television hosts
American hunters
American male writers
American people of Italian descent